This is a list of ethnic groups in Ethiopia that are officially recognized by the government. It is a list taken from the 2007 Ethiopian National Census: Population size and percentage of Ethiopia's total population according to the 1994 and 2007 censuses follows each entry.

Ethiopia's population is highly diverse, containing over 80 different ethnic groups. Most people in Ethiopia speak Afro-Asiatic languages, mainly of the Cushitic and Semitic branches. The former includes the Oromo and Somali, and the latter includes the Amhara and Tigray. Together these four groups make up three-quarters of the population.

The country also has Omotic ethnic groups who speak Afro-Asiatic languages of the Omotic branch. They inhabit the southern regions of the country, particularly the Southern Nations, Nationalities and Peoples' Region. Among these are the Welayta and Gamo.

Nilo-Saharan-speaking Nilotic ethnic groups also inhabit the southwestern regions of the country, particularly in the Gambela Region. Among these are the Nuer and Anuak who are also found in South Sudan which borders the Gambela Region.

Officially recognized ethnic groups in Ethiopia

See also

Demographics of Ethiopia

References

Ethiopia
Ethnic